Pholidophoridae is an extinct family of primitive stem-teleost fish that lived during the Triassic period. Most of the genera are from the Late Triassic (Carnian and Norian ages) of Europe, but one (Malingichthys) is known from the Middle Triassic (Ladinian) of China. The pholidophorids were historically united with several other stem-teleost lineages into the order Pholidophoriformes; however, Pholidophoriformes in its traditional sense is now thought to be paraphyletic with respect to crown group teleosts.

Phylogeny 
Below is a cladogram simplified after Bean (2021):

References 

 
Prehistoric ray-finned fish families
Ladinian first appearances
Norian extinctions
Taxa named by Arthur Smith Woodward